Habreuresis is a genus of South American dwarf spiders that was first described by Alfred Frank Millidge in 1991.  it contains only two species, both found in Chile: H. falcata and H. recta.

See also
 List of Linyphiidae species (A–H)

References

Araneomorphae genera
Linyphiidae
Spiders of South America
Endemic fauna of Chile